Harina de Otro Costal (Another Matter) is a Venezuelan telenovela produced by and shown on Venevisión and Venevisión Continental in 2010. This telenovela, written by Mónica Montañés is a free version of William Shakespeare's Romeo and Juliet.

Daniela Bascopé and Christian McGaffney star in the roles of Valentina and Victor respectively. Sabrina Seara and Adrián Delgado also appear.

The telenovela was premiered on April 7, 2010.

Plot
Valentina Fernández (Daniela Bascopé) is a young woman born into a high class family. She is the daughter of Don Aniceto who started a bakery with his best friend Don Plutarco, the father of Victor Hernández (Christian McGaffney). Both families are now at war due to the appearance of Santos (Ivan Tamayo) a greedy man who carried on an affair with both their wives in secret. However, in the midst of this conflict, a pure love develops between Valentina and Victor, but their love not only has to face the challenge of the feud between their families, but the interference of Cándida (Sabrina Seara), a young virgin who is determined to marry Victor, and Calipe (Adrián Delgado), a selfish man who is determined to woo Valentina at whatever cost.

Cast
 Daniela Bascopé ... Valentina Fernández
 Christian McGaffney ... Victor Hernández
 Carlos Mata ... Plutarco Hernández
 Mimí Lazo ... Maigualida de Hernández
 Mayra Alejandra ... Carmencita de Fernández
 Basilio Álvarez ... Aniceto Fernández
 Sabrina Seara ... Cándida Roca
 Adrián Delgado ... Carlos Felipe Colón "Calipe" 
 Ivan Tamayo ... Santos
 Crisol Carabal ... Angeles
 Henry Soto ... Inocencio Roca
 Lourdes Valera ... Gracia de Roca
 Carlos Villamizar ... Jesús María
 Paula Bevilacqua ... Linda
 Rhandy Piñango ... Tranquilino
 Prakriti Maduro ... Bella
 Freddy Galavís ... Eráclito
 Paula Woyzechowsky ... Pristina
 Lisbeth Manrique ... Socorrito
 Mario Sudano ... Edén
 Mariaca Semprún ... Lorenza
 Jenny Valdés ... Afrodita
 Marisol Matheus ... Pragedes
 Daniela Salazar ... Adelita
 Andreína Carvo ...  Provimar
 Alexander Solórzano ... Custodio
 Geisy Rojas ... Grecia
 Rodolfo Salas ... Plutarco "Plutarquito" Fernández
 Nataly Lopez ... Coromotico
 Héctor Zambrano ... Hector
 Luis Núñez
 Omar González
 Juan Simón Vila
 Akzomin Acosta
 Rafael Hernández
 Miguel Riviera
 Melisa Hinijosa
 Raúl Hernández ... Selocuido/Carlos Chirinos
 Andrea García
 Arismart Marichales
 Agustín Segnini ... Cuartoekilo
 Luis Pérez Pons ... Gordo
 Nelson Farías ... Augusto
 María Laura Zambrano ... Leidy
 Mirtha Borges ... Natividad Chirinos

References

External links

Venevisión telenovelas
2010 telenovelas
Venezuelan telenovelas
Spanish-language telenovelas
2010 Venezuelan television series debuts
2010 Venezuelan television series endings
Television shows set in Caracas